Whiskey Street is a bar and restaurant in Salt Lake City, Utah, United States. The establishment is owned and operated by Bourbon House Group.

History
Whiskey Street participated in the city's 'open streets program' during the COVID-19 pandemic.

Reception
In 2014, Kelli Nakagama named Whiskey Street the city's 'Best Bar for Whiskey' in The Utah Review overview of the "Best Bars in Salt Lake City". The bar was included in Salt Lake Magazine 2017 list of the "Top Salt Lake City Bars and Nightclubs".

References

External links

 

Culture of Salt Lake City
Restaurants in Utah